Pierluigi Martini (born 23 April 1961) is an Italian former racing driver. He won the 1999 24 hours of Le Mans and participated in 124 Formula One Grands Prix (with 119 starts) between 1984 and 1995.

Early life
Martini's uncle, Giancarlo Martini, raced during the 1970s, including some non-championship races in a Ferrari 312T entered by Scuderia Everest, a team owned by Giancarlo Minardi. Pierluigi's younger brother, Oliver, is also a racing driver.

Formula One
Martini participated in 124 Formula One Grands Prix, debuting on 9 September 1984, driving for Toleman in place of suspended Ayrton Senna at the 1984 Italian Grand Prix. He scored a total of 18 championship points and was synonymous with the Minardi team (run by the same Giancarlo Minardi who had previously owned Scuderia Everest).

Indeed, aside from a single outing with Toleman and a one-season dalliance with Scuderia Italia in 1992, Martini's entire Formula One career was spent with the Italian outfit. He raced with the minnow team in three different stints, drove for them on their debut in 1985, scored their first point in the 1988 Detroit Grand Prix, and their only front-row start at the 1990 United States Grand Prix (where unexpected rain on Saturday meant that the grid was decided entirely by times from Friday's session. Pirelli's soft qualifying tyres caught Goodyear off guard, and the Italian manufacturer put five of its teams in the top ten positions). Both Martini and Minardi led a race for a single lap at the 1989 Portuguese Grand Prix, and their joint-best finish was 4th at the 1991 San Marino Grand Prix and 1991 Portuguese Grand Prix, the latter being Martini's single finish on the lead lap. Initially out of a drive for 1993, he was recalled back to the little Italian team midway through the season in place of Fabrizio Barbazza, Martini impressed by outpacing his young team mate Christian Fittipaldi.

Martini was also one of the drivers with a reputation for ignoring blue flags. Examples given are the 1991 Monaco Grand Prix when he held up Emanuele Pirro in the Dallara, Stefano Modena in the Tyrrell, and Riccardo Patrese in the Williams for several laps despite running towards the back of the field, and the 1995 Canadian Grand Prix where he blocked Gerhard Berger in the Ferrari when the Austrian tried to lap him. On both occasions Martini was called in for a 10-second stop and go penalty for ignoring blue flags. Quizzed about this attitude on the occasion of the 1995 San Marino Grand Prix, where he held up winner Damon Hill, Martini replied: 'What should I exactly apologise for? My trajectories are always clean. Should I just park the car on the grass? I'm here to do my race like anybody else. I've always been correct. Those who complain about my conduct should explain why they cannot overtake me when their car has at least 150 hp more than mine'.

Sportscars
Prior to commencing his Formula One career, Martini drove a Lancia LC2 in the 1984 24 Hours of Le Mans. After leaving Formula One, he began a successful career in sportscar racing. He contested the 1996 24 Hours of Le Mans in a Porsche run by Joest Racing. 1997 brought a fourth-place finish in a Porsche 911 GT1 which he also raced in the FIA GT Championship that year. In 1998, he joined the brand new Le Mans program of BMW Motorsports.
 
In 1999, Martini, Yannick Dalmas and Joachim Winkelhock won the Le Mans 24 Hours. The trio drove for BMW. The team had to fight both Toyota and Mercedes works cars and won the race by a lap from the runner-up Toyota.

Martini returned to motorsports in 2006, competing in the Grand Prix Masters series for retired Formula One drivers.

Racing record

Career summary

Complete European Formula Two Championship results
(key) (Races in bold indicate pole position; races in italics indicate fastest lap)

Complete International Formula 3000 results
(key) (Races in bold indicate pole position; races in italics indicate fastest lap.)

Complete Formula One results
(key)

Complete 24 Hours of Le Mans results

Complete Grand Prix Masters results
(key) Races in bold indicate pole position, races in italics indicate fastest lap.

Sources
 DRIVERS: PIERLUIGI MARTINI, GrandPrix.com

External links

F1 Rejects article
Driver Database Stats
Racing Reference Stats

1961 births
Living people
Sportspeople from the Province of Ravenna
Italian racing drivers
Italian Formula One drivers
European Formula Two Championship drivers
Italian Formula Three Championship drivers
FIA European Formula 3 Championship drivers
Toleman Formula One drivers
Minardi Formula One drivers
Scuderia Italia Formula One drivers
Grand Prix Masters drivers
24 Hours of Le Mans drivers
24 Hours of Le Mans winning drivers
International Formula 3000 drivers
American Le Mans Series drivers
World Sportscar Championship drivers
Superstars Series drivers
BMW M drivers
Porsche Motorsports drivers
Team Joest drivers
Schnitzer Motorsport drivers